Andy Baetens (born 24 February 1989) is a Belgian professional darts player who currently plays in World Darts Federation (WDF) and Professional Darts Corporation (PDC) events. Three-time winner of the Czech Open and a multiple winner of other international tournaments. Bronze medalist of the WDF Europe Cup. He qualified three times for the WDF World Darts Championship.

Career
Baetens took part in the first international tournaments shortly after he start playing darts. He advanced to the quarter-finals at the Antwerp Open during 2015 edition. In 2016, he advanced to the quarter-finals of the Polish Open. With his final victory over Darryl Fitton at the Czech Open in 2016, Baetens was able to win his first major title before he finally made his breakthrough on the tour in 2017.

With the Romanian Classic, the Belgium Masters and the England Masters, Baetens won three World Darts Federation tournaments and was able to qualify for his first 2018 BDO World Darts Championship. He also reached the semi-finals of the German Masters and the final of the Denmark Open. At the 2018 BDO World Darts Championship, he entered the tournament in 13th place on the seeding list and defeated Scott Baker in the first round. In second round he surprisingly defeated Scott Mitchell by 2–4 in sets. In the quarter-finals, Baetens missed six match darts and lost to Scott Waites by 1–4 in sets.(This is not possible. To have match darts in a best of 7 match a player would need to have won 3 sets. You cannot have match darts and lose 4-1)

Baetens back to international tournaments at the 2020 Dutch Open, where he advanced to the quarter-finals. He beat Dirk van Duijvenbode and Mario Vandenbogaerde, until Brian Raman stopped him in the deciding leg of the quarter-finals match. In September 2021, he won the Catalonia Open and FCD Anniversary Open. In November 2021, he took victory at the Czech Open for a second time.

In April 2022, he played at the 2022 WDF World Darts Championship. In the first round he beat Dave Parletti by 3–1 in sets. In the second round he beat Scott Marsh. His avarage for the match of 102.79 was the third highest in the history at the Lakeside Country Club. In the quarter-finals he played against Thibault Tricole and finally lost by 3–4 in sets.

At the end of September, Baetens qualified for the 2022 Belgian Darts Open via the Host Nation Qualifier. There he lost in the first round match against Madars Razma. After few weeks, Baetens won a title at the Bruges Open. In November 2022, he won Czech Open for the third time. In the final duel against Antony Allen, he beat him by 5–0 in legs. He qualified for the 2022 Winmau World Masters, where he reached the fourth round, and for the 2023 WDF World Darts Championship.

World Championship results

BDO/WDF
 2018: Quarter-finals (lost to Scott Waites 4–5)
 2022: Quarter-finals (lost to Thibault Tricole 3–4)
 2023:

External links
 Andy Baetens' profile and stats on Darts Database

References

Living people
Belgian darts players
British Darts Organisation players
1989 births
Sportspeople from Aalst, Belgium